Princess Raheela Zarmeen Ahmadzai is a Pakistani footballer and the manager of the Pakistan women's national football team and Balochistan United FC.

Family 
She is the daughter of Pakistani women's football President Princess Rubina Irfan and the sister of late Balochistan United and national team forward Princess Shahlyla Ahmadzai.

Coaching 
Princess Zarmeen is the first Pakistani to acquire the master's degree of FIFA, which qualifies her to work with the Asian Football Confederation (AFC) and FIFA.

K-Electric F.C. 
In October 2015, Princess Zarmeen became the first Pakistani woman to work as a coach of a men's team, K-Electric F.C.

References

External links 
 
 

1983 births
Living people
Pakistani women's footballers
Female association football managers
Footballers from Quetta
Date of birth missing (living people)
Women's association footballers not categorized by position
Pakistani football managers